Bobby Robinson (born Morgan Clyde Robinson; April 16, 1917 – January 7, 2011) was an American independent record producer and songwriter in New York City, most active from the 1950s through the mid-1980s.

Robinson produced hits by Wilbert Harrison, The Shirelles, Dave "Baby" Cortez, Elmore James, Lee Dorsey, Gladys Knight & The Pips, King Curtis, Spoonie Gee, Grandmaster Flash & The Furious Five, Doug E. Fresh, and Treacherous Three. He founded or co-founded Red Robin Records, Sue Records, Whirlin' Disc Records, Fury Records, Fire Records and Enjoy Records. Bobby Robinson's catalog is represented by Mojo Music & Media.

Biography
Born in Union, South Carolina, Robinson served in the US Army in World War II. After the war, Robinson moved to New York City and opened "Bobby's Record Shop" (later "Bobby's Happy House") in 1946. There were only a few Black-owned businesses on 125th Street in Harlem during this period. Robinson's record shop became one of them.  Located on the corner of 125th St. and Frederick Douglass Boulevard.  His shop remained open until January 21, 2008, only being forced to close because the landlord planned to raze the building.

Robinson's store became a focal point for the independent record producers establishing themselves in New York.  During this time,  Robinson spent time assisting Ahmet Ertegun at Atlantic Records. He produced his first recording in 1951, "Bobby's Boogie" by saxophonist Morris Lane and his band.  Robinson normally specialised in recording vocal groups including the Mello-Moods, the Rainbows, the Vocaleers and the Du Droppers. He also recorded blues performers such as Sonny Terry and Brownie McGhee

Robinson's first major success was "Shake Baby Shake" by Champion Jack Dupree in 1953. The record was released on Red Robin Records, which Robinson had established the previous year. The label was originally named Robin Records, but legal threats forced him to change it.

Having enjoyed healthy local sales with doo-wop and blues discs in the early-to-mid-1950s, Robinson established several more record labels, some in partnership with his brother, Danny Robinson. Among them were Whirlin' Disc Records in 1956, Fury Records and Everlast Records in 1957, Sue Records with Juggy Murray in 1957, Fire Records in 1959, and Enjoy Records in 1962. He launched Fire and Fury as vehicles for rhythm and blues and rock and roll artists, most of which were produced by him in New York City, but some were produced by others and acquired by him in various Southern cities.

Robinson produced top-selling records by Wilbert Harrison, The Shirelles, Lee Dorsey, and Dave "Baby" Cortez, many of whom were signed to the label by A&R man Marshall Sehorn. One of his earliest hits was Harrison's "Kansas City", over which he faced legal action brought by Herman Lubinsky of Savoy Records, who claimed he had Harrison under contract. Robinson produced Gladys Knight & the Pips' first hit, "Every Beat of My Heart" (after he signed them to Fury; the original version was recorded in Atlanta, issued locally on Huntom and leased to Vee Jay, who had the bigger hit). Robinson produced several Elmore James records as well as recordings by Lightnin' Hopkins, Arthur Crudup, and Buster Brown. King Curtis's "Soul Twist" was the first release of his Enjoy label in 1962, and over twenty years later, he released the hit, "I’m The Packman (Eat Everything I Can)" by The Packman, on the same label. The rights to Robinson's recordings on Fire and Fury were sold to Bell Records in 1965.

Compilation album producer Diana Reid Haig wrote:The common thread that connected all of Robinson's various record labels was his uncanny ability to bring out the best in his artists. While most producers at that time attempted to soften the edges of rhythm & blues singers in hopes of appealing to the pop market, Robinson delighted in capturing raw-edged artists like Elmore James and Buster Brown just as they were.

In the 1970s, Robinson produced some of the first hip-hop music records for his "Enjoy" label . In 1979, he recorded Grandmaster Flash & the Furious Five's first record, "Superrappin'", an innovative record which was influential in hip-hop's early years. A local hit in New York, the record failed to hit nationwide.  Robinson then produced records by Pumpkin and Friends, the Funky Four Plus One More, Spoonie Gee (Robinson's nephew), and Kool Moe Dee with the Treacherous Three.  He produced Doug E. Fresh's "Just Having Fun (Do The Beatbox)", which introduced beatboxing to the record-buying public.

Robinson died on January 7, 2011, at the age of 93, after a period of declining health.

Discography

Selected production credits
 "Kansas City" by Wilbert Harrison, 1959
 "Dedicated to the One I Love" by The Shirelles, 1959
 "The Happy Organ" by Dave "Baby" Cortez, 1959
 "Fannie Mae" by Buster Brown, 1959
 "You Don't Have to Go" by Sam Myers, 1960
 "The Sky Is Crying" by Elmore James, 1960
 "Ya Ya" by Lee Dorsey, 1961
 "Tossin' and Turnin'" by Bobby Lewis, 1961
 "Every Beat of My Heart" by Gladys Knight & the Pips, 1961
 "Soul Twist" by King Curtis, 1962
 "Wiggle Wobble" by Les Cooper, 1962
 "Love Rap" by Spoonie Gee, 1980
 "Superappin" by Grandmaster Flash & The Furious Five, 1979
 "Rappin' And Rocking The House" by the Funky Four Plus One More, 1979 (at over fifteen minutes, one of the longest rap records of its time)
 "Rockin' It" by The Fearless Four, 1982
  several hits by Kool Moe Dee with the Treacherous Three ("The New Rap Language", "Feel The Heartbeat", "At The Party" and "Body Rock")

Fire 7" discography
1000 – Tarheel Slim And Little Ann – It's Too Late / Don't Ever Leave Me
1001 – Earl Lewis & The Channels – The Girl Next Door / My Heart Is Sad
1002 – Mary Ann Fisher – Wild As You Can Be / Put On My Shoes
1003 – Willis Jackson Band – Good To The Bone / Making It
1004 – ?
1005 – Vinnie & Kenny – Schooltime / Who (Is The Girl)
1006 – Wild Jimmy Spurill – Hard Grind / Kansas City March
1007 – Rockin' B Bradley – Lookout / I Have News For You
1008 – Buster Brown – Fannie Mae / Lost In A Dream
1009 – Tarheel Slim & Little Ann – Much Too Late / Lock Me In Your Heart
1010 – May Ann Fisher – As Wild As You Can Be / Only Yesterday
1011 – Elmore James And His Broomdusters – Make My Dreams Come True / Bobby's Rock
1012 – The Rainbows – Mary Lee / Evening
1013 – Little Bobby Roach – Mush / More Mush
1014 – Bobby Marchan & The Tick Tocks – Shoppin' And Accusin' / This Is The Life
1015 – Johnny Acey – Why / Please Don't Go Back (To Baltimore)
1016 – Elmo James And His Broomdusters – The Sky Is Crying / Held My Baby Last Night
1017 – Tarheel Slim & Little Ann – Can't Stay Away Part 1 / Part 2
1018 – Paul Perryman – Look At My Baby / Keep A'Calling
1019 – Riff Ruffin – All My Life / Gravy Train
1020 – Buster Brown – The Madison Shuffle / John Henry (The Steel Driving Man)
1021 – Tarheel Slim & Little Ann – Forever I'll Be Yours / Anything For You
1022 – Bobby Marchan – There's Something On Your Mind Part 1 / Part 2
1023 – Buster Brown – Is You Is Or Is You Ain't My Baby / Don't Dog Your Woman
1024 – Elmore James – Rollin' And Tumblin' / I'm Worried
1025 – Billy Lewis – Tell All The World About You /Heart Trouble
1026 – The Gay Poppers – I Want To Know / I've Got It
1027 – Bobby Marchan – Booty Green / It Hurts Me To My Heart
1028 – Bobby Marchan – You're Still My Baby Part 1 / Part 2
1029 – The Upsetters – Jaywalkin' / Steppin' Out
1030 – Tarheel Slim & Little Ann – Security / Bless You My Darling
1031 – Elmo James – Done Somebody Wrong / Fine Little Mama
1032 – Buster Brown – Doctor Brown / Sincerely
1033 – Mighty Joe Young – Empty Arms / Why Baby
1034 – Lightin' Hopkins – Mojo Hand / Glory Be
1035 – Bobby Marchan – All In My Mind / I Miss You So
1036 – Johnny Chef – Can't Stop Moving / Baby Please Come Back
1037 – Bobby Marchan – What You Don't Know Don't Hurt You / I Need Someone (I Need You)
1038 – The Tellers – I Wanna Run To You / Tears Fell From My Eyes
1039 – The Gay Poppers – Please Mr Cupid / You Got Me Uptight
1040 – Buster Brown – Blues When It Rains / Good News
500 – Willie Bradford – So Long / Wanna Be Loved
501 – Dr Horse – I'm Tired Of It / Think I Know
502 – Otis Scott – New Kind Of Love / ?
503 – Slim And Ann, Orchestra Conducted By Larry Lucie – It's A Sin / You're Gonna' Reap (Everything You Sow)
504 – Elmore James – Look on Yonder Wall / Shake Your Moneymaker
505 – Chuck Bradford – You're Gonna Miss Me / Say It Was A Dream
506 – Tarheel Slim & Little Ann – Forever I'll Be Yours / Can't Stay Away From You
507 – Buster Brown – I'm Going Out But I'll Be Back / Sugar Babe
508 – Don Gardner & Dee Dee Ford – I Need Your Lovin' / Tell Me
509 – ?
510 – Bobby Marchan – Yes It's Written All Over Your Face / Look At My Heart
511 – Chuck Bradford – You Can't Hurt Me Anymore / Wherever You Are
512 – Linda Martell & The Anglos – A Little Tear / The Things I Do For You
513 – Don Gardner & Dee Dee Ford – Don't You Worry / I'm Coming Home To Stay
514 – Dr Horse – Jack The Cat Was Clean / Salt Pork West Va
515 – ?
516 – Buster Brown – Raise A Ruckus Tonight / Gonna Love My Baby
517 – Don Gardner & Dee Dee Ford – Lead Me On / Tcb (Taking Care Of Business)
1501 – Arthur Crudup – Rock Me Mama / Mean Ole Frisco
1502 – Arthur Crudup – Katie Mae / Dig Myself A Hole
1503 – Elmore James – Strangerblues / Anna Lee
2020 – Elmore James – Pickin' The Blues / It Hurts Me To
2021 – Buster Brown – Sugar Babe / Don't Dog Your Woman
2022 – Larry Dale – Rock A While / The Things I Used To Do
5001 – Darwin Nelson – Mary Sue / Good Gosh Gerty – 1959

Fire LP discography
FLP-100 – Here Are The Hits! – Various Artists [1959] Original cover has photograph of teenagers dancing. Record label is white with red printing. Deserie – Charts/Mary Lee – Rainbows/Dear One -Scarlets/I've Lost – Scarlets/I – Velvets/I Cried – Velvets//My Love Will Never Die – Channels/Bye Bye Baby – Channels/Evening – Rainbows/Oh Gee Oh Gosh – Kodaks/I'm So Happy – Teen Chords/Lydia – Teen Chords
FLP-100 – Memory Lane – Various Artists [1959] Second cover called "Memory Lane, Hits by the Original Groups", there is no picture. Record label is red with black printing. Deserie -Charts/Mary Lee – Rainbows/Dear One -Scarlets/I've Lost – Scarlets/I – Velvets/I Cried – Velvets//My Love Will Never Die – Channels/Bye Bye Baby – Channels/Evening – Rainbows/Oh Gee Oh Gosh – Kodaks/I'm So Happy – Teen Chords/Lydia – Teen Chords
FLP-101 – Buster Brown New King Of The Blues – Buster Brown [1960] Label is white with red printing. FLP-101 in trail off area of LP. Fannie Mae/John Henry/Madison/St. Louis Blues/When Things Go Wrong/Lost In A Dream//Is You Is Or Is You Ain't/Don't Dog Your Woman/Blue Berry Hill/Sincerely/I'm Goin' But I'll Be Back
FLP-102 – Buster Brown New King Of The Blues – Buster Brown [1960] Cover is blue with drawing of Buster Brown, label is red with black printing. FLP-101 in trail off area of LP even though the cover and label say FLP-102. Fannie Mae/John Henry/Madison/St. Louis Blues/When Things Go Wrong/Lost In A Dream//Is You Is Or Is You Ain't/Don't Dog Your Woman/Blue Berry Hill/Sincerely/I'm Goin' But I'll Be Back
FLP-103 – Mean Ol' Frisco – Arthur "Big Boy" Crudup [1960] Label is red with black printing. Mean Ole Frisco/Look On Yonder Wall/That's Alright/Ethel Mae/Too Much Competition/Standing At My Window//Rock Me Mama/Greyhound Bus/Coal Black Mare/Katie Mae/Dig Myself A Hole/So Glad You're Mine
FLP-104 – Mojo Hand – Lightnin' Hopkins [1962] Label is red with black print. Mojo Hand/Coffee For Mama/Awful Dream/Black Mare Trot/Have You Ever Loved A Woman//Glory Bee/Sometimes She Will/Shine On Moon!/Santa
FLP-105 – I Need Your Lovin' – Don Gardner/Dee Dee Ford [1962] Need Your Lovin'/Now It's Too Late/Nobody But You/Make The Girl Love Me/You Said/Tell Me//I Need You/I'm Coming Home To Stay/What A Thrill/Honey Sweet/Don't You Worry

Fury 7" discography
1000 – Lewis Lymon & The Teenchords – I'm So Happy (Tra La La La La La) / Lydia
1001 – The Miracles – Your Love (Is All I Need) / I Love You So
1002 – Hal Paige & The Whalers – Don't Have To Cry No More / Pour The Corn
1003 – Lewis Lymon & The Teenchords – Honey Honey (You Don't Know) / Please Tell The Angels
1004 – Little Bobby Rivera & The Hemlocks – Cora Lee / Joys Of Love
1005 – The Federals – While Our Hearts Are Young / You're The One I Love
1006 – Lewis Lymon & The Teenchords – I'm Not Too Young To Fall In Love / Falling In Love
1007 – The Kodaks With Pearl McKinnon – Teenager's Dream / Little Boy And Girl
1008 – Bobby & Buddy – What's The Word – Thunderbird / I Cried
1009 – The Federals – Dear Loraine / She's My Girl
1010 – The Emotions – Candlelight / It's Love
1011 – The Du Mauriers – All Night Long / Baby I Love You
1012 – The Velvets – Dance Honey Dance / I – I – I (Love You So – So – So)
1013 – The Duals – Wait Up Baby / Forever And Ever
1014 – Sherman & Darts – Remember (It's Only You And I) / Rockin' At Midnight
1015 – The Kodoks Featuring Pearl McKinnion – Oh Gee, Oh Gosh / Make Believe World
1016 – Tarheel Slim – Number 9 Train / Wildcat Trainer
1017 – The Southwinds – Build Me A Cabin / They Call Me Crazy
1018 – Curtis Carrington – I'm Gonna Catch You / You Are My Sunshine
1019 – The Kodaks – Kingless Castle / My Baby And Me
1020 – The Kodaks – Run Around Baby / Guardian Angel
1021 – The Channels – My Love Will Never Die / Bye Bye Baby
1022 – The Vibra-Harps – The Only Love Of Mine / Be My Dancing Partner
1023 – Wilbert Harrison – Kansas City / Listen My Darling
1024 – Hal Paige & The Whalers – Going Back To My Home Town / After Hours Blues
1025 – Gino – Catastrophe / Right From The Start
1026 – The 3 Emotions – Night We Met / The Girl I Left Behind
1027 – Wilbert Harrison – Cheating Baby / Don't Wreck My Life
1028 – Wilbert Harrison – 1960 / Goodbye Kansas City
1029 – The Premiers – I Pray / Pigtails Eyes Are Blue
1030 – June Bateman – Believe Me Darling / Come On Little Boy
1031 – Wilbert Harrison – C C Rider / Why Did You Leave
1032 – Clarence "Junior" Lewis – Cupid's Little Helper / Half A Heart
1033 – Gil Hamilton – Much Obliged / Pretty Baby
1034 – The Starlites – Valarie / Way Up In The Sky
1035 – Sammy Myers – You Don't Have To Go / Sad Sad Lonesome Day
1036 – The Scarlets – Truly Yours / East Of The Sun
1037 – Wilbert Harrison – Since I Fell For You / Little School Girl
1038 – Delmar – Depending On You / Lizzie Mae
1039 – Little Junior Lewis – Come On Back Where You Belong / And That's All I Need
1040 – Little Junior – Can She Give Me Fever / Your Heart Must Be Made Of Stone
1041 – Wilbert Harrison – The Horse / Da-De-Ya-Da (Anything For You)
1042 – Helen Bryant – That's A Promise / I've Learned My Lesson
1043 – Riff Ruffin – Hucklebuck Scratch / Dig That Rock & Roll
1044 – Buddy Skipper – The Clock / No More Doggin'
1045 – The Starlites – Ain't Cha' Ever Coming Home / Silver Lining
1046 – Ike Nesbit – I Want You / I'm Lonely
1047 – Wilbert Harrison – Happy In Love / Calypso Dance
1048 – Pearl & The Deltars – Teenage Dream / Dance Dance Dance
1049 – Charles Baker – Love Will Make You / Darling Here You Are
1050 – Gladys Knight & The Pips – Every Beat Of My Heart / Room In Your Heart
1051 – Buddy Skipper – Make Believe Baby / Back On The Beach Again
1052 – Gladys Knight & The Pips – Guess Who / Stop Running Around
1053 – Lee Dorsey – Ya Ya / Give Me You
1054 – Gladys Knight & The Pips – Letter Full Of Tears / You Broke Your Promise
1055 – Wilbert Harrison – Drafted / My Heart Is Yours
1056 – Lee Dorsey – Do-Re-Mi / People Gonna Talk
1057 – Jackie & The Starlites – I Found Out Too Late / I'm Coming Home
1058 – Barry & The Tots – Christmas Each Day Of The Year / I'm A Happy Little Christmas Tree
1059 – Wilbert Harrison – Let's Stick Together / Kansa City Twist
1060 – Little Joe Cook – This I Know / These Lonely Tears
1061 – Lee Dorsey – Eenie Meenie Miny Moe / Behind The 8 Ball
1062 – Buddy Skipper – Don't Be A Shame / Baby Please
1063 – Wilbert Harrison – Let's Stick Together / My Heart Is Yours
1064 – Gladys Knight & The Pips – Operator / I'll Trust In You
1065 – ?
1066 – Lee Dorsey – You Are My Sunshine / Give Me Your Love
1067 – The Pips – Darling / Linda
1068 – Slim & Little Ann – Send Me The Pillow You Dream On / I Love You Because
1069 – Tyron Rowe – Mama Don't Allow / I'm A Go'fer
1070 – Jimmy Ricks – I Wonder / Let Me Down Easy
1071 – The Channels – My Love Will Never Die / Bye Bye Baby
1072 – ?
1073 – Gladys Knight – Come See About / I Want That Kind Of Love
1074 – Lee Dorsey – Hoodlum Joe / When I Met My Baby
5000 – Billy Habric – Human / Talk To Me Baby
5001 – Wilbert Harrison – (If Women Are) Trouble / Let's Have Some Fun
5002 – Willie Hightower – If I Had A Hammer / So Tired
5003 – Man U Huffman – Things Go Better With You / School Boy In Love
5004 – Willie Hightower – Let's Walk Together / I Love You
5005 – Billy Hambrick – You're A Sweetheart / Flaming Mamie
5006 – Billy Hambre – This Is My Prayer / Everybody Needs Love
5050 – Johnny Jones – Tennessee Waltz / I Find No Fault
5051 – Ricky Lewis – Cupis / Somebody's Gonna Want Me
5052 – Joe Haywood – Ghost Of A Love / Debt Of Love

Fury LP discography
FULP-1001 – Letter Full Of Tears – Gladys Knight & Pips [Unissued?] The trail off wax of FULP-1003 also has FLP-1001 which is scratched out. This would indicate that the Gladys Knight album was intended to be Fury 1001.
FULP-1002 – Ya Ya – Lee Dorsey [1962] Yellow label with black printing. Ya Ya/Give Me You/Do-Re-Me/People Gonna Talk/Chin Chin/Mess Around//Eenie Meenie Mini Mo/One And One/Yum Yum/Ixie Dixie Pixie Pie/Behind The Eight-Ball
FULP-1003 – Letter Full Of Tears – Gladys Knight & Pips [1962] The label is yellow with black printing. Trail off wax contains FU-LP-1003 and FLP 1001 which is scratched out. Letter Full Of Tears/You Broke Your Promise/Operator/I'll Trust In You/Morning Noon And Night/I Can't Stand By//Every Beat Of My Heart/Room In Your Heart/Guess Who/Stop Running Around/What Shall I Do?

Enjoy 7" discography
1000 – King Curtis – Soul Twist / Twisting Time
1001 – King Curtis – Wobble Twist / Twisting With The King
1002 – Chuck Paulin – Everybody's Talking / ?
1003 – Janet Calloway & Chuck Paulin – Lover's Prayer / Mercy Mercy
1003 – Janet Calloway – Lovers Prayer / Bank Of Love (note diff. b-side and no mention of Paulin)
1004 – Jay Cee's – Just Say The Word / The Waddle
1005 – Titus Turner – People Sure Act Funny / My Darkest Hour
1006 – ?
1007 – Betty Boothe – I'm The One Who Needs You / Just A Little Bit Of True Love
1008 – Noble Watts – Jookin / Noble Watts And June Bateman – What Ya Gonna Do
1009 – The Naturals – Swingin' Low / Lenny Goofed
1010 – Rinkydinks – Hot Potato Part 1 / Part 2
1011 – Les & Gloria – Twisting One More Time / Peter Piper
1012 – Ti Mattison – Don't Make Me Cry / Please Don't
1013 – The Cross Jordan Singers – Jesus Died / Troubled No More
1014 – Mary B – Ain't Nobody's Business / Cut It Out
1015 – Titus Turner – Soulville / My Darkest Hour
1016 – Jimmy Armstrong – Count The Tears / I'm Going To Lock My Heart
2001 – Channels – Sad Song / My Love
2002 – Johnny Wilson – Please Be Fair / You're Still My Baby
2003 – The Hootenaires – Baby, Baby (I Love You) / Bill Bailey (Come On Home)
2004 – Barry & The Tots – I'm A Happy Little Christmas Tree / Christmas Each Day Of The Year
2005 – Charlie Lucas – Walkin' / Jump For Joy
2006 – Wild Jimmy Spruill – Cut And Dried / The Rooster
2007 – Riff Ruffin – Plain English / Hoop And Holler
2008 – Ronnie & The Manhattans – Come On Back / Long Time No See
2009 – Louis Jones – I Believe In My Soul / Hurry Baby
2010 – Titus Turner – Bow Wow / I Love You Baby
2011 – Little Joe & The Thrillers – Peanuts And Popcorn / Chicken Little Boo Boo
2012 – Gladys Knight & The Pips – What Shall I Do / Love Call
2013 – Joe Haywood – Warm And Tender Love / I Would If I Could
2014 – Tarheel Slim & Little Ann – Got To Keep On Lovin' You / You Make Me Feel So Good
2015 – Elmore James – It Hurts Me Too / Bleeding Heart
2015 – Elmore James – It Hurts Me Too / Pickin' The Blues
2016 – Joe Haywood – When You Look In The Mirror (You're Looking At The One You Love) / Talk To Me Baby (Put Some Sugar In My Ear)
2017 – Jay Dee Bryant – You're Hurting Me / Get It
2018 – Riff Ruffin – Home Cookin / Hot Waffles
2019 – Willie Hightower – Too Late / What Am I Living For
2020 – Elmore James – Mean Mistreatin' Mama / Bleeding Heart
2021 – Bobby Porter – Foxy Devil / Searching For Love
2022 – Elmore James – Look On Yonder Wall / Shake Your Moneymaker
2023 – Sammy Taylor – Ain't That Some Shame / Next In Line
2024 – Les Cooper – Owee Baby / Let's Do The Boston Monkey
2025 – Ster-Phonics – Roamin' Heart
2026 – ?
2027 – Elmore James – Dust My Broom / Everyday I Have The Blues
2028 – Sammy Taylor – Don't Lie / Your Precious Love
5000 – Rocky O'Neal – Here I Go / Where Am I Going Wrong
5001 – Ricky Lewis – Welcome Home / Somebody's Gonna Want Me
5050 – Ricky Lewis – Cupid / Somebody's Gonna Want Me
6009 –	Grandmaster Flash & The Furious Five / Super Rappin' No. 2 / Super Rappin' Theme
6016 –	Treacherous Three / Feel The Heartbeat (Have Fun)

Enjoy label – 12" Discography
6000 – Funky Four Plus One More – Rappin' And Rocking The House (12")
6001 – Grandmaster Flash & The Furious Five – Superappin' (12")
ER-6002 – Spoonie Gee & The Treacherous Three – The New Rap Language / Love Rap (12")
ER-6006 – Kool Kyle The Starchild – Do You Like That Funky Beat (Ahh Beat Beat) (12")
ER-6007 – Treacherous Three – The Body Rock (12")
ER-6008 – Treacherous Three – At The Party (12")
ER-6010 – Disco Four – Move To The Groove (12")
ER-6011 – Grandmaster Flash & The Furious Five – Super Rappin' No.2 (12")
ER-6012 – Doctor Ice – Calling Doctor Ice (12")
ER-6013 – Treacherous Three – Feel The Heartbeat (12")
ER-6014 – Kool Kyle The Starchild – It's Rockin Time (12")
ER-6017 – Disco Four – Do It, Do It (12")
ER-6018 – Treacherous Three – Put The Boogie In Your Body (12")
ER-6021 – Midnight Blue – Enjoy With Me (12")
ER-6022 – Spanish Fly & The Terrible Two – Spanglish (12")
ER-6023 – Higher Ground – Shake 'Em Up (12")
ER-6023 – Higher Ground – Shake 'Em Up (12")
EN-1163 – The Packman – I'm The Packman (Eat Everything I Can) (12")
EN-1163 / EN-1164 – The Packman – I'm The Packman (Eat Everything I Can) (12", Promo)
ER-6024 – The Fearless Four – It's Magic (12")
ER-6024 – The Fearless Four – It's Magic (12", RE)
ER-6025 – Silver Star – Eei Eei O (12")
ER-6026 – Disco Four – Country Rock And Rap (12")
ER-6028 – The Fearless Four – Rockin' It (12")
ER-6029 – Masterdon Committee – Gonna' Get You Hot (12")
ER-6031 – The Packman – I'm The Packman (Eat Everything I Can) (12")
EN-6032 – Masterdon Committee – Funk Box Party (12")
EN-6033 – Masterdon Committee – Musicgram (12")
ER-6034 – The Source – The Ghetto (12")
ER-6035 – Doug E. Fresh – Just Having Fun (Do The Beat Box) (12")
EN-6036 – Spoonie Gee – New Love Rap (12")
EN-6037 – Crazy Eddie (3) & Jazaq – Come On Party People (Lets Ge Down) (12")
EN-6038 – New York City Trooper – Here We Go (12")
EN-6039 – Ninga – Crack Attack (12")
EN-6040 – DLB (The Microphone Wizard) – Magic (12")
EN-6044 – Masterdon – I Paid The Cost To Be The Boss (12")
ER-6041 – The Deuce II – Are You Ready (For The Big Throwdown) (12")

Enjoy LP discography
ENLP-2001 – Soul Twist – King Curtis [1962] Label is gold with blue printing. Soul Twist/Twisting Time/What'd I Say/I Know/Sack O' Woe Twist/Camp Meetin'//Wobble Twist/Irresistible You/Big Dipper/Twisting With The King/Midnight Blue

Everlast LP discography
ELP-201 – Our Best To You – Various Artists [1960] Label is orange with black printing. Deserie – Charts/Zoop – Charts/Why Do You Cry – Charts/Dance Girl – Charts/You're The Reason – Charts/I've Been Wondering – Charts//I Want To Know – Ladders/Counting The Stars – Ladders /My Love Has Gone – Ladders /Lorraine – Harmonaires/Come Back – Harmonaires/Baby – Bop-Chords
ELP-202 – Wiggle Wobble – Les Cooper and the Soul Rockers [1963] Label is white and orange with black printing. Popeye Dance/Wiggle Wobble No. 2/Jungle Pony/Dig Yourself/Shimmy Rock/Wiggle Wobble//The Monkey/Hippity Hop/Wobble Party/Twistin' One More Time/Bossa Nova Dance/At The Party

Front Page 7" discography
1000 – Joe Haywood – I'm Walkin' / Strong Feelin'
1001 – The Victones – I Need You So / My Baby Changes
1002 – Jim And Lee – Adam And Eve / I'll Never Change
1003 – Joe Haywood – I Cross My Heart And Hope To Die / In Your Heart You Know I Love You
2301 – Lee Moses – Time And Place / I Can't Take No Chances
2302 – The Victones- Somebody Really Loves You / Two Sides To Love

References
 
 "Harlem - The Vision of Morgan and Marvin Smith" documenting a Black-owned business on 125th Street in Harlem back in 1939. Retrieved November 26, 2021.

Bibliography
 Gillett, Charlie. The Sound of the City: The Rise of Rock and Roll (1970, several later editions)
 Wilmer, Val. Bobby Robinson: Legend of the Back Streets. Melody Maker. November 18, 1978, pp. 47–48, 56

External links
Bobby and Danny Robinson's labels discographies

Bobby Robinson labels album discographies
"In Harlem, 2 Record Stores Go the Way of the Vinyl" in The New York Times, January 21, 2008, p. B1

1917 births
2011 deaths
African-American record producers
Record producers from South Carolina
American hip hop record producers
United States Army soldiers
United States Army personnel of World War II
20th-century African-American people
21st-century African-American people